John Pitre (born 1942 in New York City) is an American visionary art painter based in Hawaii. He has been called the most bankable living American surrealist.

One of Pitre's best known paintings is A New Dawn, a 1965 work which shows a modern human reduced to the status of a caveman in the midst of smoldering urban ruins.  This painting, in the weeks after the September 11, 2001 attacks more than thirty five years later, was seen by some as a foreshadowing of what came to be known as the Ground Zero of those events.  In 2004, the owner of the original painting, which was valued in 1997 at $1.7 million, offered A New Dawn in trade for a £1 million house on the London real estate market.

Pitre's art addresses issues such as ecology, overpopulation, responsibility for stewardship of the Earth, the quest to understand the mysteries of the universe, and the fragility of life and of relationships. Posters of his paintings were very popular in the 1960s and 1970s and one of them, a print of his painting Restrictions,  has sold several million copies.

Pitre studied at the Art Students League of New York.

Inventions 
Pitre is also an inventor.  Pitre invented the Range of Motion (ROM) and Time Works exercise equipment  which was rated the "Best of What's New in 1993" by Popular Science magazine.   With decorative tile artist Thomas Deir,  who was his apprentice at the time, Pitre co-invented Genesis Artist Colors,  a synthetic oil paint which remains wet and malleable until it is heat cured.

Pitre is also a diver,  an environmentalist,  the founder and director of Natural Power Concepts,  and pilots helicopters  and ultralight seaplanes.

Books
 John Pitre: The Art and Works of a Visionary.  Barbara T. Erskine and Roger Jellinek, eds.  Honolulu: Pitre Fine Arts, 1996.  .

References

External links
 The Official Website of John Pitre

Living people
1942 births
American inventors
20th-century American painters
American male painters
21st-century American painters
21st-century American male artists
American aviators
Artists from Hawaii
Art Students League of New York alumni
Painters from New York City
20th-century American male artists